Gol Zard (also Romanized as Gol-e Zard) is a village in Oshtorinan Rural District, Oshtorinan District, Borujerd County, Lorestan Province, Iran. At the 2006 census, its population was 205, in 67 families.

References 

Towns and villages in Borujerd County